James Stratton may refer to:
 James Robert Stratton, Ontario businessman and political figure
 James H. Stratton, United States Army general